Crenvurșt  is a Romanian sausage, similar to American hot dog made with beef's meat and bacon finely chopped, placed in sheep's intestines and often served by pair.

The word Crenvurșt comes from German Krenwürstchen.

References 

 

Romanian delicatessen